The Sextans Dwarf Spheroidal is a dwarf spheroidal galaxy that was discovered in 1990 by Mike Irwin as the 8th satellite of the Milky Way, located in the constellation of Sextans.  It is also an elliptical galaxy, and displays a redshift because it is receding from the Sun at 224 km/s (72 km/s from the Galaxy). The distance to the galaxy is 320,000 light-years and the diameter is 8,400 light-years along its major axis.

Like other dwarf spheroidal galaxies, the Sextans Dwarf's population consists of old, metal-poor stars: one study found that the majority of stars have a metallicity between [Fe/H] = −3.2 and −1.4. An analysis of several stars found them to also be deficient in barium, except for one star.

References

Dwarf spheroidal galaxies
Local Group
Milky Way Subgroup
Sextans (constellation)
?